Super TV is a Korean variety show by Super Junior distributed by XtvN and tvN. The show airs on Xtvn every Thursday at 08:00 PM KST and tvN every Friday at 6:40 PM KST. Originally it was on air on both stations every Friday at 11:30 PM KST before being moved on June 7, 2018.

History
Super Junior made a success with their own short reality show SJ Returns back in 2017 and promised to come back as a fixed reality show. On January 2, 2018, a source from Label SJ announced that the group will be launching their own variety show titled “Super TV”. Season 1 aired from January 28, 2018 until April 13, 2018. The show went on hiatus after that and returned on May 29, 2018 with an earlier introduction on SMTOWN's V Live channel.

Season 2 aired from June 7, 2018 until August 23, 2018. On this season, the show changed its format. The programme changed its day and time slot from every Friday at 11:30 PM KST to every Thursday at 08:00 PM KST for Xtvn and every Friday at 6:40 PM KST for tvN . On 23 August, the show went on hiatus again and promised to come back for a third season.

Plot

Season 1: Super Junior Crazy Idol Variety (슈퍼주니어 i돌아이어티)
Super TV is a new concept variety show in which varied entertainment formats are re-created and twisted in Super Junior's own way. This concept is called Super Junior Crazy Idol Variety (슈퍼주니어 i돌아이어티).
The show's format will include quiz show, talk show, game show, eating show, reality, documentary, sports, film and comedy.

Season 2: King's Game (왕좌의 게임)
Super TV returns with a new concept variety show titled Game of Thrones (왕좌의 게임). Super Junior is famous for being King of Variety Show idols and will invite any idols who want to challenge them for the title. The show will still include the previous season's format, the difference being other idols will challenge them. If they can win 5 episodes in a row, they will go for a luxury holiday overseas. The term was changed from episode 8, to just 3 consecutive wins for a vacation within South Korea.

Each episode has two main segments. The first one is Liar King (라이어 왕), a segment where Super Junior verifies if the guests' listed skills and specialties are true. This is done through games or showing of talents, where the guests are labeled as "liars" should they fail the verification.

The second segment consists of a maximum of two games that Super Junior has chosen to challenge the guests:
 Rokkuko King (로꾸거 왕) – Questions are being read backwards by each team and the opposing team will have to answer them correctly.
 Food Show King (먹방 왕) – The game played in this segment is related to eating.
 Inference King (추리 왕) – One team will be given a title of movie or song and they need to say one syllable each at the same time. The opposing team will have to answer the title correctly.
 Chair King (의자 왕) – The teams battle through chair-curling.
 Acting King (연기 왕) – The game played in this segment is related to acting.
 Relay King (릴레이 왕) - A battle of cohesiveness.
 Mission King (미션 왕) - A game to clear away all their mission cards.
 Escape King (탈출 왕) - A game where each team must find clues and solve several difficult puzzles to escape.
 Speed King (스피드 왕) - A battle of agility.
 Description King (묘사 왕)
 Dance King (댄스 왕)
 Flexibility King (유연상 왕)
 Ladder King (사다리 왕)

Special Episode: Member TV (속 TV)
Member TV is a special episode of Super TV that was only aired on V Live and YouTube. In this special episode, the members show their daily lives or their own special segment.

Cast 
The show's cast is made up of Super Junior members.

Episodes

Season 1

Season 2

Special Episode

Ratings
In the ratings below, the highest rating for the show will be in red, and the lowest rating for the show will be in blue episode.

Season 1 

 Note that the show airs on a cable channel (pay TV), which plays part in its slower uptake and relatively small audience share when compared to programs of terrestrial free-to-air networks such as KBS, SBS, MBC or EBS.
 NR rating means "not reported". The rating is low.
 Episode 1 and 4 were only aired on XtvN, not tvN, where the ratings are coming from

References

External links
 

 Super Junior's Super TV Season 1 at Naver TV *
 Super Junior's Super TV Season 2 at Naver TV *
 Super Junior's Super TV Official Facebook

Super Junior television series
2018 South Korean television series debuts
Television series by SM C&C
XtvN original programming
TVN (South Korean TV channel) original programming